Swimming at the 2002 West Asian Games was held at Fahad Al-Ahmad Swimming Complex, Kuwait City, Kuwait from 4 April to 7 April 2002.

It had a men's only programme containing 16 events. A total of 9 nations (Iran, Syria, Kuwait, Saudi Arabia, Jordan, UAE, Palestine, Qatar and Lebanon) participated.

Medalists

Medal table

References

Official website

External links
Olympic Council of Asia - 2002 West Asian Games

West Asian Games
2002 West Asian Games
2002